Akbarabad (also Romanized as Akbarābād; also known as Akbarābād-e ‘Olyā) is a village in Qareh Chay Rural District, in the Central District of Saveh County, Markazi Province, Iran. At the 2006 census, its population was 307, in 70 families.

References 

Populated places in Saveh County